Algonac State Park is a public recreation area covering  along the St. Clair River, two miles north of the city of Algonac in St. Clair County, Michigan. The state park's half mile of river frontage offers a view of passing international freighters.

History
The park was established in 1937 with initial state acquisition of 373 acres of land. Over the next ten years, additional acquisitions increased the park size to approximately 980 acres. Park development began in the 1940s.

Natural features
Approximately 83% of the park is undeveloped. The undeveloped portion encompasses significant "lakeplain" prairie and savannas ("oak openings"), described as unique natural environments in Michigan. The park is home to 22 species of plants, birds and butterflies classified by the state as endangered, threatened, or of special concern.

Activities and amenities
The park offers shoreline walleye fishing, hiking, camping, cross-country skiing, shooting range, picnicking facilities, and a playground. It is excellent for watching freighters and hunting.

References

External links
Algonac State Park Michigan Department of Natural Resources 
Algonac State Park Map Michigan Department of Natural Resources

State parks of Michigan
Protected areas of St. Clair County, Michigan
Protected areas established in 1937
1937 establishments in Michigan
IUCN Category III